Fairfield is a census-designated place (CDP) in Adair County, Oklahoma, United States. The population was 584 at the 2010 census.

History
Mulberry Mission was founded in Pope County, Arkansas Territory, among the Western Cherokees by  Dr. Marcus Palmer It was a branch of Dwight Mission, which moved to Indian Territory and was renamed as the Fairfield Mission, when most of the Cherokees were forced to move there from their former homes in the Southeast. In 1832, The mission established a lending library that contained about 150 books. No structures remain in place. The mission cemetery still remains, and it has been renamed as McLemore Cemetery.

Geography
Fairfield is located at  (35.857975, -94.616168).

Demographics

As of the census of 2000, there were 367 people, 118 households, and 96 families residing in the CDP. The population density was 102.3 people per square mile (39.5/km2). There were 124 housing units at an average density of 34.6/sq mi (13.3/km2). The racial makeup of the CDP was 36.51% White, 49.05% Native American, and 14.44% from two or more races. Hispanic or Latino of any race were 1.63% of the population.

There were 118 households, out of which 44.9% had children under the age of 18 living with them, 59.3% were married couples living together, 13.6% had a female householder with no husband present, and 18.6% were non-families. 16.9% of all households were made up of individuals, and 7.6% had someone living alone who was 65 years of age or older. The average household size was 3.11 and the average family size was 3.45.

In the CDP, the population was spread out, with 36.2% under the age of 18, 8.2% from 18 to 24, 28.6% from 25 to 44, 18.8% from 45 to 64, and 8.2% who were 65 years of age or older. The median age was 29 years. For every 100 females, there were 101.6 males. For every 100 females age 18 and over, there were 90.2 males.

The median income for a household in the CDP was $23,750, and the median income for a family was $26,667. Males had a median income of $23,000 versus $19,722 for females. The per capita income for the CDP was $10,497. About 27.5% of families and 25.5% of the population were below the poverty line, including 25.6% of those under age 18 and 21.1% of those age 65 or over.

Notable person
Mike Dart, award-winning, contemporary Cherokee basket weaver

Notes

References

Census-designated places in Adair County, Oklahoma
Census-designated places in Oklahoma
Pre-statehood history of Oklahoma
Populated places established in 1832
1832 establishments in Indian Territory